Kurt Samuel Vile (born January 3, 1980) is an American singer, songwriter, multi-instrumentalist, and record producer. He is known for his solo work and as the former lead guitarist of rock band the War on Drugs. Both in the studio and during live performances, Vile is accompanied by his backing band, the Violators, which currently includes Jesse Trbovich (guitar, saxophone), Rob Laakso (guitar, bass, keyboards), Kyle Spence (drums) and Adam Langellotti (bass).

Influenced by Pavement, John Prine, Neil Young, Ween, Tom Petty, Dinosaur Jr., and John Fahey, Vile began his musical career creating lo-fi home recordings with frequent collaborator Adam Granduciel in Philadelphia, with whom he has participated in early work by the War on Drugs as well as various solo projects. Focusing on his solo career, Vile released two albums, Constant Hitmaker (2008) and God Is Saying This to You... (2009), compiling various home recordings dating back to 2003. Vile signed to Matador Records in 2009, and released his third album, Childish Prodigy, that same year. The album was his first recorded in a studio and with the full participation of the Violators.

In 2011, Vile released his fourth studio album, Smoke Ring for My Halo, which significantly increased his exposure. His fifth studio album, Wakin on a Pretty Daze, was released in 2013, with Laakso replacing Granduciel in his backing band. In 2015, Vile released his sixth studio album, B'lieve I'm Goin Down....  The lead single from the album, "Pretty Pimpin", was Vile's best performing song to date, topping the Billboard Adult Alternative Songs chart in March 2016. His 2017 release, Lotta Sea Lice, is a collaboration with Australian singer and guitarist Courtney Barnett. In 2018, he released his eighth studio album, Bottle It In, followed by a country-influenced EP, Speed, Sound, Lonely KV, in 2020.

Biography

Beginnings (1994–2002)
Vile grew up in Lansdowne, Pennsylvania, a suburb of Philadelphia, and is the third oldest of ten children born to Charles and Donna Vile. Although his surname is occasionally assumed to be a pseudonym and a pun on German composer Kurt Weill, it is his real birth name and the similarity to Weill's name is a coincidence.

At the age of fourteen, Kurt Vile was given a banjo by his father, with Vile noting, "I kind of wished [it] was a guitar. So I'd kind of just play it like a guitar anyway. I was really into writing pretty primitive tunes, and really into recording. I pretty much knew I was going to do music [with my life] then." Vile began writing songs on the banjo, describing his first self-penned track as: "a joke song. It was a good instrumental; I knew all these chords, but then I was quoting a cartoon as the lyrics on top of it. I had seen this cartoon about Superman and Lex Luthor; it was like the back history of why Lex Luthor hated Superman. They used to be friends, and then some giant stone of kryptonite fell and it made Lex Luthor's hair fall out, and he was like, 'You made all my hair fall out!' It was a really stupid cartoon, but that was my song, 'You Made All My Hair Fall Out'."

Three years later, Vile created his first "mass-produced" tape at the age of seventeen. Influenced by Pavement, Beck, Smog and the record label, Drag City, Vile noted, "I really thought I could be on Drag City. I really wanted that. I heard these people that made good music but it was still pretty raw, and had this real cult quality."

While working on his home recordings, Vile worked as a forklift driver, from 2000 to 2002. Regarding this time in his life, Vile noted "It was a really fast-paced job, unloading trucks. Though music was my passion, I had a long way to go then and a lot to learn. I got depressed so many times by my blue-collar life, and self-conscious about the fact that I didn't go to college. I was always working super low-end jobs, being the complete opposite of what I wanted to be. But I just fell into it, and I was also sorta shy. It was definitely a pretty rough time."

The War on Drugs and Constant Hitmaker (2003–2008)
In 2003, after staying in Boston for two years, Vile moved back to Philadelphia, and began collaborating with musician and songwriter Adam Granduciel. The duo subsequently formed the indie rock band The War on Drugs in 2005. Regarding his friendship with Granduciel, Vile noted, "We're essentially best friends. He was backing me up in my band when he started working on his own music, so I thought I’d return the favor." Granduciel and Vile released their debut studio album, Wagonwheel Blues, in 2008 and embarked on a tour in support of its release.

At this time, Vile's debut solo album, Constant Hitmaker (2008), was released on Gulcher Records. Vile subsequently decided to leave The War on Drugs to concentrate on his solo career. The album was compiled from various home recordings and one studio recording of the song "Freeway". In 2009, Vile noted, "The War On Drugs got put out on a bigger label first, so, in the blogosphere, some claim that The War on Drugs was my first, main band. But that's just the way it looks. I've made more music than Adam has, and have been doing my Kurt Vile thing for a little bit longer. And Constant Hitmaker came out around that same time. Right when that [War on Drugs] record came out, I went to Europe with them, and also opened as Kurt Vile. That was right when I decided I wanted to concentrate on doing my own thing." Despite Vile's departure, Granduciel remained a member of his backing band, The Violators, with Granduciel noting, "There was never, despite what lazy journalists have assumed, any sort of falling out, or resentment."

God Is Saying This to You... and Childish Prodigy (2009–2010)
In April 2009, Mexican Summer released God Is Saying This to You...; a collection of Vile's home recordings dating back to 2003 on vinyl only. Upon its release, Vile had already recorded a studio album, Childish Prodigy, which Vile described as "definitely not as lo-fi" as his previous releases. After shipping the record to various labels, Vile signed with Matador Records in May 2009. Vile noted, "It's a perfect fit. They were my number one choice. I don't really consider my music indie rock or think that Matador cater only to indie rock, but I still feel I can relate most to Matador, more than any other label. Not to mention the fact that they are way on top of their shit."

Recorded with backing band The Violators, Childish Prodigy was released on October 6, 2009, and increased Vile's exposure significantly. Support slots with Dinosaur Jr, Thurston Moore and Fucked Up followed the album's release. Regarding his new position, Vile stated, "Obviously there's more touring, more press and more hype which I won't say is not deserved. There's like a faction of people, too, who like to talk shit, which is kind of new. When I was more independent, there were people who got really excited and there still are but once I got more press people started to comment on blogs. People like to talk shit. [...] It's like climbing a ladder. I like to climb it really slowly. I could probably get really professional right away, but I like to take baby steps and find my own way."

Smoke Ring for My Halo (2011–2012)
Vile released his fourth studio album, Smoke Ring for My Halo, in 2011. The album peaked at #154 on the Billboard Top 200 and placed highly on many end-of-year lists, and in 2013 was named at number 475 in NME's '500 Greatest Albums of All Time'. Later in 2011, Vile released a companion EP, So Outta Reach, and appeared on his former band The War on Drugs' second studio album, Slave Ambient. Shortly after the release of Smoke Ring for My Halo, longtime Violators guitarist Adam Granduciel departed from the band to fully focus on The War on Drugs, with Vile noting, "Adam, he plays in The War on Drugs, his record came out a little after mine did, so at first he toured, and now he's obviously busy with that and now he's working on his new record."

Wakin on a Pretty Daze (2013–2014)
Wakin on a Pretty Daze was released on April 9, 2013. Regarding the current line-up of his backing band, Vile noted, "I'm playing with Jesse [Trbovich] and Rob [Laakso]. [...] Rob Laakso is the newest member and Jesse has been a member forever. They're steady members. Our drummer is no longer with us, but other than that, different friends played drums on the record and we're doing rehearsals with that right now. But other than that, the Violators are me, Jesse, and Rob and we'll see how it evolves." Priestess drummer Vince Nudo subsequently joined the band on drums and percussion, after performing on two of Wakin on a Pretty Dazes tracks.

Steve Gunn joined the band as an "auxiliary Violator", during the band's May 2013 tour dates, with Vile noting, "It's impossible to just talk about Steve. He's too good! He's so good; just listen to him. What can I even say about him that touches that? I just want to listen to him."

On September 24, 2013, Vile announced the release of a new EP, It's a Big World Out There (And I Am Scared), and a deluxe edition of Wakin on a Pretty Daze.

B'lieve I'm Goin Down... (2015–2017)
On March 6, 2015, Vile announced that he was working on his sixth studio album, with recording taking place across different locations in the United States. B'lieve I'm Goin Down... was released September 25, 2015, on Matador Records. Vile has described it as "All over the place. Everything you can imagine I've done... That's where I'm at now, that I can sort of tap into every world and make it cohesive." Still in Rock ranked this LP as the 2nd best of 2015.

Vile is featured on the song "Let Me Get There" by the band Hope Sandoval & The Warm Inventions released in 2016.

Vile sings lead vocals on The Sadies song "It's Easy (Like Walking)" on their 2017 album Northern Passages.

Lotta Sea Lice and Bottle It In (2017–2019)
In 2017, Vile and Courtney Barnett recorded the collaborative album Lotta Sea Lice, released on October 13. The lead single "Over Everything" was released on August 30, 2017 accompanied by the music video directed by Danny Cohen.

In 2018, Vile announced his seventh solo studio album, Bottle It In, released on October 12, 2018.

(watch my moves) (2020–present)
Vile produced and appeared on Sweep It Into Space, the twelfth album by Dinosaur Jr. which was released on April 23, 2021. On April 20, Verve Records announced that they had signed Vile after 11 years with Matador. Vile cited the Velvet Underground as an inspiration for his signing. On April 15, 2022, Verve Records released (watch my moves), Vile's ninth studio album.

Personal life
Vile is married to Suzanne Lang, a teacher, and has two daughters. He cites songwriters Randy Newman, Bob Dylan, Neil Young, and Bruce Springsteen as influences in his lyrics and music. During a 2022 episode of Rolling Stones Music Now podcast, Vile stated that he stopped drinking alcohol sometime "around the tour for Bottle It In" (in late 2018 or early 2019), but noted that he still occasionally consumes cannabis.

The Violators

Vile's backing band, The Violators, consists of:
 Jesse Trbovich guitars, bass guitar, saxophone, keyboards 
 Kyle Spence drums, percussion 
 Adam Langellotti bass guitar, keyboards 
 Rob Laakso guitars, bass guitar, keyboards, various instruments Former members'''
 Vince Nudo drums 
 Steve Gunn additional live guitars 
 Mike Zanghi drums, percussion 
 Adam Granduciel guitars, various instruments 
 "Cousin" Dan Bower drums, percussion 
 Jay Ganas bass guitar 
 Michael Johnson drums 
 Robert Robinson percussion, guitar, effects

Timeline

Discography
Solo
Studio albums

EPs
2003: Ten Songs2003: Rarities & Rejects EP2003: Fingers-Cut, Megamachine! / Kurt Vile split
2004: Kurt Vile & Family Vol. 12004: 9 Home Recordings2005: Trial & Error EP2006: Accidents2007: Kurt Vile / Beat Jams split
2008: Overnite KV!!!2009: Fall Demons2009: The Hunchback EP2010: Square Shells2011: So Outta Reach2013: It's a Big World Out There (And I Am Scared)2013: Jamaica Plain (with Sore Eros)
2015: Parallelogram (with Steve Gunn)
2016: Spotify Sessions2020: Speed, Sound, Lonely KVSingles

The War on Drugs
Studio albumsWagonwheel Blues (2008)Slave Ambient (2011)

EPsBarrel of Batteries (2007)

Dinosaur Jr.Sweep It Into Space'' (2021)

References

External links
 

1980 births
Living people
American indie rock musicians
American folk singers
American rock singers
American male singer-songwriters
American rock songwriters
American rock guitarists
American male guitarists
Singer-songwriters from Pennsylvania
Guitarists from Philadelphia
21st-century American singers
21st-century American guitarists
21st-century American male singers
Matador Records artists
Mexican Summer artists
The War on Drugs (band) members